My Thoughts is the debut studio album by American singer Avant. It was released on May 9, 2000 by MCA Records and Magic Johnson's Magic Johnson Music. Avant worked with Steve "Stone" Huff on the majority of the album. It debuted at number 45 on the US Billboard 200 and number 8 on the Top R&B Albums, selling 41,675 copies in the opening week. Certified platinum by the Recording Industry Association of America (RIAA), My Thoughts sold more than one million copies in the United States and received generally mixed to positive reviews by critics. 
The album spawned three singles that became top ten hits; including "Separated", "My First Love" featuring Keke Wyatt, a cover to its classic René & Angela hit, and "This Time". Both songs, "My First Love" and "This Time", were certified platinum by the Recording Industry Association of America (RIAA).

Critical reception

Alex Henderson from Allmusic rated the album three out of five stars and called My Thoughts "a competent, if uneven, effort," with much of the material being "routine urban contemporary fare." He found that "My Thoughts isn't mind-blowing, but it's decent more often than not and lets us know that Avant has potential."

Track listing
All tracks are produced by Steve "Stone" Huff.

Samples
"Reaction" contains elements from "Wonderful", performed by Isaac Hayes.

Charts

Weekly charts

Year-end charts

Certifications

References

2000 debut albums
Avant albums
MCA Records albums